Tachina ursinoidea is a species of fly in the genus Tachina of the family Tachinidae that can be found in Burma, China, Nepal, Taiwan, Thailand, and Indian provinces like Assam, Uttar Pradesh, and Western Bengal.

References

Diptera of Asia
ursinoidea